Utwe (or Utwa) is the second-largest municipality in the Micronesian state of Kosrae, the largest being Tafunsak.

Geography
Utwe occupies the very South of the island, but has no coast on its East border. In 1994 the total population of Utwe was 1,056. Utwe's capital is Utwa Ma (Utwe Village).

Utwe-Walung Marine Park
Utwe is home to the Utwe-Walung Marine Park, a conservation area established by Madison Nena, a local ecologist who has won several awards, including the 1999 Seacology Prize, awarded annually to an indigenous islander for outstanding achievement in preserving the environment and culture of any of the world's more than 100,000 islands. In the late 1990s, Madison Nena successfully led a campaign to prevent property developers from building a tourist complex without adequate sewage facilities, and in its place he founded an eco-tourism initiative at Kosrae Village Resort. He has also worked with island elders to revitalize historic methods of Kosraean house construction.

The park features excellent examples of healthy hard coral, as well as some of Micronesia's most pristine forests and extensive mangrove ecosystems. The park's main office is close to the shipwreck site of the infamous pirate trader Bully Hayes, and it is rumored that Hayes buried some treasure somewhere in the forest.

Education
Kosrae State Department of Education operates Utwe Elementary School. High school students attend Kosrae High School in Tofol, Lelu municipality.

Climate
Utwe has a tropical rainforest climate (Af) with very heavy rainfall year-round.

Notable people 

 Adelyn Noda - teacher and deaconess.

See also
 Lelu
 Malem
 Tafunsak
 Walung
 Kosrae

References

Maps
 General Soil Map of Kosrae produced by the US Department of Agriculture

External links
 Article on Utwe-Walung Marine Park in Pacific magazine
 Seacology profile of Madison Nena
 
 Seacology official website

Biosphere reserves of Micronesia
Municipalities of Kosrae